Nemečky is a municipality in the Topoľčany District of the Nitra Region, Slovakia. In 2011 it had 309 inhabitants.

References

External links
Nemečky
Official homepage

Villages and municipalities in Topoľčany District